Marshall Street, or "M" Street, is a street in the University Hill neighborhood in Syracuse, New York, adjacent to Syracuse University. Marshall Street often refer to the commercial area including and surrounding the 100 Block of Marshall Street. This area primarily functions as an off-campus commercial area for college students. The Marshall Street area is home to popular student bars including Faegan's Pub and Harry's Bar.

History 

Marshall Street is believed to be named for Louis Marshall (1856–1929), a Syracuse native, corporate and constitutional lawyer, and Trustee of Syracuse University, who helped reestablish the New York State College of Forestry (now SUNY-ESF) at Syracuse University. The 100 block of Marshall Street received the honorary name Louis Marshall Way in 2006. Historians are unsure if the street originally honored Louis Marshall, who only reached prominence after the turn of the twentieth century. The Marshall Square Mall is also located adjacent to Marshall Street. The area is promoted by the Crouse-Marshall Business Association. Marshall Street has been renovated many times over the years.

Stores
Shops on Marshall Street include Manny's, Jimmy Johns, The Pita Pit, Insomnia Cookies, Shirt World, Chipotle Mexican Grill, King David's, Panda West, Some Girls Boutique, Blue Monkey Cafe, Popeyes Louisiana Kitchen, Halo Tattoos, J Michael Shoes, and Starbucks.

Bars (Past & Present) 

Harry's 

Faegan's Pub

Orange Crate Brewing Co

Bragg's 

Buggsy's 

Lucy's Retired Surfers Bar

Hungry Charley's / Chuck's Cafe 

Sutter's Mill & Mining Company 

The Generic Bar 

44's 

Konrad’s Sports Bar

DJ’s on the Hill

Darwin’s Restaurant and Bar

Maggie's Tavern 

The Regatta (Inside the Sheraton Inn '80s - 00s)

Sitrus on the Hill (Inside the Sheraton Inn Present Day)

See also 
 University Hill, Syracuse

References

External links 
 

Transportation in Syracuse, New York